The Geely LC, sold in its home market as the Geely Panda or the Gleagle Panda, is a city car produced by the Chinese manufacturer Geely from November 2008 to 2016. In 2010 the LC scored 45.3 in C-NCAP crash tests, making it China's first locally researched and developed compact car to be awarded a 5-star rating, and it is subsequently the safest Chinese hatchback as of 2011. The LC was able to achieve the above despite a development process that relied more on computer simulations than actual crash tests. In 2017, The Panda was replaced by a facelifted version of the car known as the Geely Yuanjing X1.

Online sale
As of 22 December 2010, popular Chinese e-commerce retailer Taobao Mall sells the LC online although buyers must put down a 288 yuan deposit and visit a local dealership for a test drive prior to purchase. The LCs on offer are not delivered to your door.

First day online sales totalled near 500.

Styling
The LC's styling has been recognized for its exceptional exterior, which manufacturer Geely says is "bionic" and resembles a panda but that some criticize for resembling the Toyota Aygo, instead. Geely outsourced the design of the LC's exterior to another Chinese firm, CH-Auto.

Geely LC 1.5
Engine specifications  –  1.5L

Overseas sale
While the car is sold in overseas markets, its name and the brand name it is sold under may change.

Brunei
The LC was only sold in Brunei since 2013 (1 year sold), only with 5-speed manual transmission and 4 colours available.

Indonesia
The LC is sold in Indonesia as a Geely Panda.

New Zealand
The LC is sold in New Zealand as a Geely LC Hatch.

Sri Lanka
A local company, Micro Cars, offers the LC in Sri Lanka. It is domestically assembled from complete knock down kits.

Egypt
Under the name Geely Pandino, The LC is sold in Egypt.

Taiwan

A rebadged, redesigned LC called the Tobe M’Car is sold in Taiwan by Yulon Motors, which may also assemble it. The M'car uses the same body and interior as the LC but features improved performance and locally designed components.

The vehicle also provide the basis when the Dongfeng Yulon joint launched their new energy vehicle brand Yulu (裕路) in China. The Yulu EV2 electric city car is largely based on the Tobe M’Car which is a rebadged Geely Panda, with only the front and rear end being redesigned.

Cuba
In Cuba, the LC is commonly used as a rental vehicle but also sold to private owners as a Geely Panda.

Argentina
The LC is sold in Argentina since 2016.

References

External links
Official website 
Geely LC gallery and features at ChinaAutoWeb

LC
Cars introduced in 2009
Hatchbacks
2010s cars
Cars of China
City cars